Revant Optics is an American online retailer that designs, develops, and sells replacement lenses for sunglasses and prescription glasses, based in Portland, Oregon.

History 
The company was founded in 2010 in Portland, Oregon by Jason Bolt. It was included as one of the fastest-growing companies in the United States by Inc. (magazine) in 2014, 2015, and 2016. In 2017, Revant received the OEN Manufacturer of the Year Award (11-50 employees)  and in 2019, Revant was awarded the nationally recognized Bronze Stevie Award for Customer Service Department of the Year. In 2019, founder and CEO Jason Bolt won the Oregon Entrepreneurs Network Entrepreneurial Achievement Award that recognizes an entrepreneur or founding team with a record of outstanding achievement within the past 18 months.

Headquarters 
Revant’s world headquarters are located in the Central Eastside Industrial District of Portland, near Burnside Skatepark. The 15,000 SF masonry building was originally built in 1936 for coffee production but later served as a warehouse for the Shleifer furniture business, until its closure in 2016.

In Spring 2018, the building completed a comprehensive core and shell renovation and now houses Revant’s headquarters, manufacturing, and sales operations.

References

External links

Eyewear brands of the United States
Companies based in Portland, Oregon
Retail companies established in 2010
2010 establishments in Oregon
Eyewear companies of the United States
American companies established in 2010